Isidore Proulx (March 13, 1840 – July 28, 1904) was an Ontario farmer, merchant and political figure. He represented Prescott in the House of Commons of Canada, as a Liberal Party member from 1891 to 1904.

Proulx was born in Saint-Hermas, Lower Canada in 1840, and he served as clerk for Saint-Hermas for 20 years. In 1861, he married Philomène Lalande. Proulx ran unsuccessfully in the riding of Deux-Montagnes for a seat in the Quebec legislative assembly in 1874. He moved to Plantagenet, Ontario in 1881, where he was a justice of the peace and served five years as reeve for North Plantagenet Township. His first election in 1891 was declared invalid after an appeal but he won the subsequent by-election. After his death in office in 1904, his son Edmond was elected to replace him in the House of Commons.

References 
 Histoire des Comtes Unis de Prescott et de Russell, L. Brault (1963)
 
The Canadian parliamentary companion, 1891 JA Gemmill

1840 births
1904 deaths
Liberal Party of Canada MPs
Members of the House of Commons of Canada from Ontario
Franco-Ontarian people
Canadian justices of the peace